Asia LIFE University also known as Gospel Theological Seminary is a Christian university in Daejeon, Korea.

Asia LIFE University is based on the foundations of the Pentecostal and evangelical theology with emphasis on the Four Square Gospel of salvation, Spirit-baptism, healing and return of Christ. Gospel Theological Seminary, as it was known before, strives to educate Christian leaders who are dedicated to the evangelical ministry.

Religious objectives
To train people to be competent and experienced as faithful Christian leaders whose doctrine is rooted in the Pentecostal theology.
To train people to be leaders who seek to live out the Word under the Lordship of Jesus Christ.
To train people to be talented as international Christian leaders who take the leadership of the world missions with the help of an education. An education that allows theological exchanges worldwide with lectures conducted in English and Korean.
To train people to be leaders of small groups.
To train people to be theologists and leaders who are committed, and contribute themselves, to the development of theology and knowledge.

Areas of study
Spiritual Theology
Biblical Theology (Old Testament/New Testament)
Missiology
Systematic Theology
Historical Theology
Practical Theology
Pastoral Counseling

See also
List of colleges and universities in South Korea
Education in South Korea

External links 
  
  

Universities and colleges in Daejeon
Private universities and colleges in South Korea
1974 establishments in South Korea
Educational institutions established in 1974